This table explains the conjugation of auxiliary Catalan verbs.

Notes

 The past, also called preterite, is rarely used in the spoken and written language and the same applies for the past anterior in both indicative and subjunctive moods (because it has the past form of haver in the composite form). In the modern language, the periphrastic past and the periphrastic past anterior replace the past and the past anterior. The main auxiliary verb is anar, but one must pay attention that it is conjugated in a slightly different way than the actual anar (a non-auxiliary verb expressing the meaning 'to go'). e.g. (Jo) vaig anar = I went.
 The participle must agree with the noun in grammatical gender (masculine or feminine) and number (singular or plural).
 Haver is never used in the imperative and all of the composite tenses.
 The personal pronouns are omitted in the spoken and written language, except only where to clear up the ambiguity and that is usually when the conjugated verbs look similar (ex.: the conjugated first and third person singulars in the imperfect). The pronouns may also be used to empathize the verbs. In this list, the pronouns only serve as a guide for each grammatical person.

See also
Conjugation of regular Catalan verbs

Catalan grammar
Catalan conjugation auxiliary verbs